Nguyễn van Bakel (born Danny van Bakel on 8 December 1983) is a Dutch-born Vietnamese retired professional footballer who played as a defender.

Club career

Early years 
Van Bakel kicked off his career with Helmond Sport in 2002 playing in Eerste Divisie. He made 19 appearances for the club before joining Dijkse Boys in 2005. In 2008, he switched club and country signing for amateur club Cappellen in Belgium. He played there for one year before he returned to Dijkse Boys. After the club was expelled from the league in November 2010, he went on to play for Lommel United, in the Belgian Second Division.

Vietnam 
In 2011, Van Bakel signed a year and half contract with Vietnamese club Bình Dương though he first refused the offer. He played two seasons with the club making 28 appearances before joining Đồng Nai in 2013. The following year he was recruited by Thanh Hóa. In Thanh Hóa, he has become a fan favourite and is known as Dutch David Beckham.

Personal life 
Van Bakel is married to DJ Myno whose real name is Nguyễn Thị Ngọc My. On 18 September 2014, she gave birth to a baby boy whom they have named David van Bakel. In October 2015 Van Bakel expressed his desire to acquire Vietnamese citizenship and to represent the Vietnamese team internationally. In early January 2016, he was granted Vietnamese citizenship and adopted the name, Nguyễn van Bakel.

References

External links 
 
 Voetbal International profile

1983 births
Living people
People from Geldrop
Naturalized citizens of Vietnam
Association football defenders
Dutch footballers
Vietnamese footballers
Helmond Sport players
Royal Cappellen F.C. players
Lommel S.K. players
Becamex Binh Duong FC players
Dong Nai FC players
Thanh Hóa FC players
V.League 1 players
Eerste Divisie players
Dutch expatriate footballers
Expatriate footballers in Belgium
Expatriate footballers in Vietnam
Dutch expatriate sportspeople in Belgium
Dutch expatriate sportspeople in Vietnam
Footballers from North Brabant